Stephen Robert Herek (born November 10, 1958) is an American film director. Herek was born in San Antonio, Texas. He attended the University of Texas at Austin.

Career
His career as a film director took off in 1986 with the cult horror classic Critters followed by the hit comedy Bill and Ted's Excellent Adventure in 1989. He then directed Don't Tell Mom the Babysitter's Dead in 1991 and became a regular director for The Walt Disney Company throughout the decade, helming The Mighty Ducks in 1992, The Three Musketeers in 1993, the highly successful live-action 1996 remake of 101 Dalmatians starring Glenn Close, and the Eddie Murphy comedy Holy Man in 1998. He also directed the critically acclaimed drama Mr. Holland's Opus in 1995.

In the 2000s, Herek directed the 2001 movie Rock Star, a film about a rockstar wannabe and his favorite rock group, Steel Dragon, starring Mark Wahlberg and Jennifer Aniston. After the underwhelming performances of Life or Something Like It in 2002 and Man of the House in 2005, Herek has stayed mainly in the television and direct-to-DVD market, helming films like Picture This, Into the Blue 2: The Reef, and The Chaperone, as well as two Dolly Parton TV specials.

Filmography

Film 

Executive producer
 Reverse Runner (2012)

Television 
TV series

TV movies

Awards and nominations

References

External links
 

1958 births
Living people
People from San Antonio
University of Texas at Austin alumni
Film directors from Texas
American television directors
Comedy film directors
American people of Slavic descent